Nádleehi is a social and, at times, ceremonial role in Diné (Navajo) culture – an "effeminate male" or "male-bodied person with a feminine nature". However, the nádleehi gender role is also fluid and cannot be simply described in terms of rigid gender binaries. Some Diné people recognize four general places on the gender spectrum: feminine woman, masculine woman, feminine man, and masculine man. Nádleehí may express their gender differently from day to day, or during different periods over their lifetimes, fulfilling roles in community and ceremony traditionally held by either women or men. At times, some may hold positions that can only be held by people who are near the middle of the gender spectrum. Contemporary nádleehí may or may not participate in the modern, pan-Indian two-spirit or LGBT communities. Notable people who were recognized by their communities as nádleehí are traditional weaver and ceremonial singer Hosteen Klah (1867–1937) and Fred Martinez, who was murdered at the age of 16 in June 2001.

Role in Diné society 
Traditionally, a nádleehí person is recognized at a young age by the ceremonial elders and their own family, as they are seen instinctively taking on what are typically female roles in that society, as well as the clothing and work usually associated with females in that culture. As they mature they usually also find themselves sexually attracted to other males, and this is usually accepted by the community. A nádleehí'''s role in life might be somewhat fluid depending on context, such as when with different groups of people or in different cultural contexts. The nádleehí social and ceremonial role differs from other two-spirit roles in that it is specific to Diné culture and communities; other Nations that have roles for two-spirits – if they have them at all – have names in their own languages, and roles and other details tend to be specific to those particular cultures.

The difference in Diné perception of gender-nonconforming individuals and western perception was noted as early as the 1920s. A contemporary writer noted that while in American society gender-nonconformity was cause for anxiety, in Diné society it was seen as good fortune.

 Fred Martinez 
Fred Martinez lived in Cortez, Colorado, on a Diné reservation, with his mother Pauline Mitchell. Friends of Martinez said that he was often harassed in school by their peers, for his feminine nature. Martinez's mother was supportive of her son and his friends, a number of whom were also gender nonconforming or LGBT. Diné society is traditionally matrilineal, with honored social and ceremonial roles for certain gender-variant members of the community, and Martinez's mother, grandmother, and others in the community recognized and accepted him as nádleehí.

Fred Martinez was murdered by Shaun Murphey in June 2001, and it was determined that Murphey's motives were linked to Martinez's nádleehí status. Murphey was arrested and sentenced, though it was not ruled as a hate crime. A documentary about Fred Martinez's case, Two-Spirits, explores both Martinez's life and the nádleehí'' role in traditional Diné culture.

See also 
Gender roles among the indigenous peoples of North America
Gender system
Hosteen Klah
Third gender

References 

Navajo culture
Two-spirit